FK Železiarne Podbrezová is a Slovak football team, based in the town of Podbrezová.

History
Podbrezová was formed in 1920 as RTJ Podbrezová. The club is also particularly famous for its youth program that has produced many Slovak talents over the years, including Juraj Kucka, Michal Breznaník, Róbert Pich, Peter Štyvar and Marek Bažík. Podbrezová has been cooperating with the Italian club Inter, in a worldwide social project – Inter Campus (2002–2008). Argentine midfielder Pablo Podio, who played for Podbrezová, is a product of the Inter Campus project. Major achievements in the history of the club include: second place in the I. liga in the 2007/2008 season and the semifinals of the Slovak Cup in the 2001/2002 season.
In 2009–10, the club withdrew from the Slovak First League.

Fortuna Liga promotion
In 2013–2014, Podbrezová were promoted to the top flight of Slovak football for the first time in their history. The success was born under the leadership of coach Jaroslav Kentoš. The keys players were Vratislav Greško, Blažej Vaščák, Jozef Hanák, Michal Pančík and others.

Events timeline
 1920 – Founded as RTJ Podbrezová
 1930 – Merged with Tatran Horná Lehota and renamed ŠK Podbrezová
 1936 – Renamed ŠKP Podbrezová
 2006 – Merged with Brezno and renamed FO ŽP Šport Podbrezová
 2017 – Renamed FK Železiarne Podbrezová

Affiliated clubs
The following clubs are affiliated with Podbrezová:
  Kardemir Karabükspor (2017–)
  FK Poprad (2021–)
  FC Nordsjælland (2019–)
  FK Pohronie (2022–)

Honours

Domestic
 Slovak Second Division (1993–)
  Winners (2): 2013–14, 2021–22
  Runners-up (3): 2007–08, 2011–12, 2012–13

Sponsorship

Club partners 
source

Železiarne Podbrezová
Zaninoni
ŽDAS
SLOVRUR
Moravia Steel
REA-S
Pipex Italia

Current squad
As of 10 February 2023

For recent transfers, see List of Slovak football transfers winter 2022-23

Out on loan

Staff

Current technical staff
As of 4 January 2022

Club officials

Notable players
Had international caps for their respective countries

For full list, see :Category:ŽP Šport Podbrezová players

 Marius Alexe
 Michal Breznaník
 Vratislav Greško
 Filip Hlohovský
  Juraj Chvátal
  Jakub Kiwior
 Ján Krivák
 Juraj Kucka
  Milan Nemec 
 Michal Pančík
 Dejan Peševski
 Štefan Rusnák
 Pavol Šafranko
 Siradji Sani
 Samuel Štefánik
 Peter Štyvar
 Blažej Vaščák
 Mateusz Zachara

Notable managers

  Milan Nemec (1998–2001)
  Ladislav Kuna (2001–04)
  Anton Jánoš (15 Aug 2006 – 31 May 2008)
  Raffaele Quaranta (1 Jun 2008 – 11 Oct 2010)
  Jaroslav Kentoš (2011– Feb 2015)
  Jozef Mores (February 2015 – June 2015)
  Zdenko Frťala (15 June 2015 – 22 Sep 2015)
  Marek Fabuľa (22 Sep 2015 – 25 April 2017)
  Karol Praženica (25 April 2017 - 20 Sep 2017)
  Marek Fabuľa (20 Sep 2017 – 21 Nov 2018)
  Gergely Geri (21 Nov 2018 – 4 Jan 2019)
  Vladimír Veselý (4 Jan 2019 – 26 Aug 2019)
  Jozef Mores (26 Aug 2019 – 6 Mar 2020)
  Martin Poljovka (6 Mar 2019 – 1 June 2020)
  Vladimír Cifranič (1 June 2020 – 4 Dec 2020)
  Mikuláš Radványi (17 Dec 2020 – 28 May 2021)
  Roman Skuhravý (28 May 2021–)

References

External links 

  

Football clubs in Slovakia
Association football clubs established in 1920
1920 establishments in Slovakia